Mary Ann Dunwell is an American politician who serves as a Democratic member of the Montana House of Representatives for District 84.

Early life 
Dunwell was born in 1954 in Wilmington, Delaware. She earned a Bachelor of Arts in speech and communications.

Montana House of Representatives 
Dunwell was elected to the Montana House of Representatives in 2014, and assumed office in January 2015.

Personal life 
Dunwell lives in Helena, Montana. She has one son.

References

Living people
Democratic Party members of the Montana House of Representatives
21st-century American politicians
People from Helena, Montana
People from Wilmington, Delaware
1954 births